The Malayali Diaspora refers to Malayali who live outside their homeland of Indian states of Kerala and Union Territories of Mahé, India and Lakshadweep. They are predominantly found in Gulf, North America, Europe, Australia, Caribbean, Africa and other regions around the world.

See also
Malayali
Kerala Gulf diaspora
Malaysian Malayali
Malayali Australians
Dravidians
Tamil diaspora
Telugu diaspora

References

Kerala society

Malayali diaspora
Malayali organizations
Dravidian peoples